The Lion's Share is a 1971 French-Italian crime-thriller film  written and directed by  and starring Robert Hossein, Charles Aznavour, Michel Constantin, Raymond Pellegrin and  Elsa Martinelli.

Plot

Cast  
 Robert Hossein as  Maurice Ménard
 Charles Aznavour  as Éric Chambon
 Michel Constantin  as  Inspector Michel Grazzi
 Raymond Pellegrin  as Marcati
 Elsa Martinelli as  Annie
 Albert Minski as  Jacques
 Michel Peyrelon as  David 
 René-Jean Chauffard  as Bank Director   
 Louis Arbessier as  Cornille   
 Robert Berri as Le patron du bistrot
 Marcel Pérès  as  Un clochard
 Coline Serreau

References

External links

1970s crime thriller films
French crime thriller films
Italian crime thriller films
Films set in France
1970s French films
1970s Italian films